National Route 213 (N213) forms a part of the Philippine highway network. It is a two-lane national secondary road spanning  that transverses eastern towns within Tarlac and Pampanga provinces.

References

Roads in Pampanga
Roads in Tarlac